KF Besëlidhja (Klubi Futbollistik Besëlidhja) is a club in Pristina, Kosovo which is playing in the Liga e Dytë (B). Last time the club was in the Football Superleague of Kosovo was in the 2000–01 season, when they were relegated. The club's best league position was in the 1994–95 season when they finished in second place. They have many known players like Mehmet Dragusha, Nazmi Binaku and Milaim Rama, which had many success times with this club. Today the club is in the 4th league.

Notes and references

Notes:

References:

Association football clubs established in 1956
Beselidhja Prishtine
Sport in Pristina